Hungary participated in the Eurovision Song Contest 2017. The local Media Services and Support Trust Fund (MTVA) and the Hungarian broadcaster Duna Media Service organised the national final A Dal 2017 in order to select the Hungarian entry for the 2017 contest in Kyiv, Ukraine.

Background

Hungary's best placing in the contest was fourth, which they achieved with their début entry in 1994 with the song "Kinek mondjam el vétkeimet?" performed by Friderika Bayer. Hungary had attempted participate in the contest in 1993, however, their entry was eliminated in the preselection show Kvalifikacija za Millstreet. Hungary withdrew from the contest for six years between 1999 and 2004 and also missed the 2006 and 2010 contests. In 2014, Hungary achieved their second-best result in the contest since their début, placing fifth with the song "Running" performed by András Kállay-Saunders. In 2016, Hungary placed 19th in the Eurovision final with the song "Pioneer" performed by Freddie.

The Hungarian national broadcaster, Media Services and Support Trust Fund (MTVA), broadcasts the event within Hungary and organises the selection process for the nation's entry. MTVA confirmed their intentions to participate at the 2017 Eurovision Song Contest on 7 May 2016. Since 2012, MTVA has organised A Dal, a national selection show which has managed to, thus far, produce entries that have qualified the nation to the final of the Eurovision Song Contest each year and has resulted in two top 10 placings in 2013 and 2014. The Hungarian broadcaster continued selecting their entry through this process for 2017 with details regarding the organization of the A Dal 2017 national final being released along with their participation confirmation.

Before Eurovision

A Dal 2017
A Dal 2017 was the sixth edition of the Hungarian national selection A Dal, which selected Hungary's entry for the Eurovision Song Contest 2017. The competition consisted of 30 entries competing in three heats, two semi-finals, and a final. The hosts are Levente Harsányi, Krisztina Rátonyi, and Csilla Tatár.

Format

Judges

Competing entries
On 11 October 2016, MTVA opened the submission period for artists and composers to submit their entries up until 20 November 2016. Two new rules for aspiring participants were created; all artists must belong to a record label or have a contract with a professional music manager, while also performers must have released an album previously or have performed their music on Hungarian television or radio. In January 2017, it was announced that Jetlag and the song "Keresem a bajt" would be replaced by Chase and the song "Dust in the Wind". Later, it was announced that Szabyest was disqualified due to his song being available to the public before 1 September 2016, which is against Eurovision rules. He was replaced by Rocktenors and their song "Ősz".

Shows

Heats
Three heats took place on 14 January, 28 January and 4 February 2017. The second heat was originally to take place on 21 January 2017, but a few hours before the show, it was announced that the heat would be postponed, due to the 2017 Verona bus crash, where several Hungarian students were killed. The timeslot was replaced by a vigil for the victims of the accident. The new date for the heat was announced on 24 January; the original third heat took place as scheduled as the second heat, with the original second heat taking place one week later as the new third heat.

In each heat ten entries competed and six entries qualified to the semi-finals after two rounds of voting. In the first round of voting, five qualifiers were determined by the combination of scores from each judge and an aggregate score from a public SMS and mobile app vote. In the second round of voting, the remaining five entries that were not in the initial top five faced a public vote consisting of votes submitted through SMS in order to determine one additional qualifier. In addition to the competing entries, other performers featured during the shows. Margaret Island performed as the interval act in heat 1, Csaba Vastag performed in heat 2, and Irie Maffia performed in heat 3.

Semi-finals 
Two semi-finals took place on 10 and 11 February 2017. In each semi-final nine entries competed and four entries qualified to the final after two rounds of voting. In the first round of voting, three qualifiers were determined by the combination of scores from each judge and an aggregate score from a public SMS and mobile app vote. In the second round of voting, the remaining six entries that were not in the initial top three faced a public vote consisting of votes submitted through SMS in order to determine one additional qualifier.

In addition to the competing entries, other performers featured during the shows. Szilvia Péter Szabó performed as the interval act in semi-final 1 and Magdi Rúzsa performed in semi-final 2.

Final 
The final took place on 18 February 2017 where the eight entries that qualified from the semi-finals competed. The winner of the competition was selected over two rounds of voting. In the first round, the jury determined the top four entries that advanced to the second round. The voting system for the four jurors was different from the method used in the heats and semi-finals. Each juror announced their scores after all songs had been performed rather than assigning scores following each performance and the jurors ranked their preferred top four entries and assigned points in the following manner: 4 (lowest), 6, 8 and 10 (highest). The four entries with the highest total scores proceeded to the second round. In the second round, "Origo" performed by Joci Pápai was selected as the winner via a public vote consisting of votes submitted through SMS, mobile app and online voting. In addition to the performances of the competing entries, guest performers included one of the judges, Caramel and A Dal 2016 winner and the 2016 Hungarian Eurovision entrant Freddie.

At Eurovision 
The Eurovision Song Contest 2017 took place at the International Exhibition Centre in Kyiv, Ukraine and consisted of two semi-finals on 9 and 11 May and the final on 13 May 2017. According to Eurovision rules, all nations with the exceptions of the host country and the "Big Five" (France, Germany, Italy, Spain and the United Kingdom) are required to qualify from one of two semi-finals in order to compete for the final; the top ten countries from each semi-final progress to the final. The European Broadcasting Union (EBU) split up the competing countries into six different pots based on voting patterns from previous contests, with countries with favourable voting histories put into the same pot.

Voting

Points awarded to Hungary

Points awarded by Hungary

Detailed voting results
The following members comprised the Hungarian jury:
 Ferenc Molnár (Caramel; jury chairperson)singer, songwriter 
 songwriter, producer, sound engineer
 Viktor Királysinger, songwriter
 Adrienn Zsédenyi (Zséda)singer, actress
 Petra Várallyaycomposer, singer, violinist

References

External links

A Dal official site

2017
Countries in the Eurovision Song Contest 2017
Eurovision